Yevpatoriya Commercial Sea Port is a large Black Sea port, the largest enterprise in the city of Yevpatoria (Autonomous Republic of Crimea).

See also

List of ports in Ukraine
Transport in Ukraine

References

Companies established in 1828
Buildings and structures in Crimea
Ports of Crimea
Enterprises of Evpatoria
Sanctioned due to Russo-Ukrainian War